Roman Laughter: The Comedy of Plautus is a book by Erich Segal, published by the Harvard University Press in 1968.  It is a scholarly study of the work of the ancient Roman playwright Titus Maccius Plautus whose "twenty complete comedies constitute the largest extant corpus of classical dramatic literature" (p. 1)

1968 non-fiction books
Harvard University Press books